Brendan Ahearn Suhr (born April 28, 1951) is an American basketball coach who is currently an assistant at Stetson. He is also a former assistant coach in the National Basketball Association (NBA), most recently with the New York Knicks where he was also the former director of player personnel and scout.

Suhr received his bachelor's degree from Montclair State University in 1973 and his master's degree in education administration from Fairfield University in 1979. He began his coaching career on the college level as an assistant at the University of Detroit Mercy, before moving to Fairfield University for five seasons. Suhr was a longtime NBA assistant coach and worked on two NBA championship teams with the Detroit Pistons, in 1988-89 and 1989–90.

From 1995 to 1997, Suhr was head coach for the Grand Rapids Mackers (later Hoops) of the Continental Basketball Association. He was CBA Coach of the Year in 1996 for leading Grand Rapids to a 33–23 record and first-place finish in the Eastern Division. Grand Rapids went 32–24 and second in the CBA Eastern Division in 1996–97.

Suhr was named an assistant on Donnie Jones' staff at Stetson on May 15, 2019.

References

1951 births
Living people
American expatriate basketball people in Canada
American men's basketball coaches
American men's basketball players
Atlanta Hawks assistant coaches
Basketball coaches from New Jersey
Basketball players from New Jersey
Continental Basketball Association coaches
Detroit Mercy Titans men's basketball coaches
Detroit Pistons assistant coaches
Fairfield Stags men's basketball coaches
Fairfield University alumni
Guards (basketball)
LSU Tigers basketball coaches
Montclair State University alumni
New Jersey Nets assistant coaches
New York Knicks assistant coaches
Orlando Magic assistant coaches
People from Fair Lawn, New Jersey
Sportspeople from Bergen County, New Jersey
Toronto Raptors assistant coaches
UCF Knights men's basketball coaches